is the debut studio album by Japanese singer Rina Chinen, released on June 10, 1998 by Sony Music Entertainment Japan. It features the singles "Do-Do for Me", "Precious Delicious", "Pinch ~Love Me Deeper~", "Break Out Emotion", and "Wing".

The album peaked at No. 2 on Oricon's albums chart. It was also certified Platinum by the RIAJ.

Track listing 
All lyrics are written by Hiromi Mori, except where indicated; all music is composed and arranged by Hiroaki Hayama, except where indicated.

Charts

Certification

References

External links 
 
 
 

1998 debut albums
Japanese-language albums
Sony Music Entertainment Japan albums